Trandafil is a surname. Notable people with the surname include: 

Grigore Trandafil (1840–1907), Wallachian-born Romanian magistrate and politician
Marija Trandafil (1816–1883), Serbian philanthropist